Staromykhailivka, sometimes transcribed as Staromikhailovka, is an urban-type settlement in the Donetsk Raion, Donetsk Oblast. Due to occupation of the settlement and other eastern portions of Marinka Raion by Russian forces, in 2020 the raion was dissolved and most of it still controlled by Ukraine merged with Volnovakha Raion. Population: 

Staromykhailivka is located on banks of Lozova river which is a tributary of Vovcha. Staromykhailivka is a suburb of Donetsk bordering the Donetsk's Abakumova neighborhood (microdistrict). The settlement has population of 5,337 (2011).

The settlement was established in 1747 by Mykhailo Motsahor and was known as Mykhailivka.

Starting Mid-April 2014 pro-Russian separatists captured several towns in Donetsk Oblast; including Staromykhailivka. On 2 August 2014 the National Security and Defense Council of Ukraine confirmed reports that Ukrainian forces had recaptured control of Staromykhailivka from pro-Russian insurgents.

As of October 2016, the settlement was under control of pro-Russian forces.

People from Staromykhailivka
 Pavlo Hryshchenko (born 1990), Ukrainian footballer

References 

Urban-type settlements in Donetsk Raion